Issues in Mental Health Nursing is a peer-reviewed nursing journal that covers psychiatric and mental health nursing. Because clinical research is the primary vehicle for the development of nursing science, the journal presents data-based articles on nursing care provision to clients of all ages in a variety of community and institutional settings. Additionally, the journal publishes theoretical papers and manuscripts addressing mental health promotion, public policy concerns, and educational preparation of mental health nurses. The editor-in-chief is Sandra P. Thomas (University of Tennessee).

See also
 List of psychiatry journals

External links 
 

Publications established in 1978
Psychiatric and mental health nursing journals
Taylor & Francis academic journals
Monthly journals
English-language journals